Glyphipterix actinobola is a species of sedge moth in the genus Glyphipterix. It was described by Edward Meyrick in 1880. It is found in Australia.

References

Moths described in 1880
Glyphipterigidae
Moths of Australia